Maxwell George Olsson (born 19 July 1967), also known as Max Olsson, is a Fijian former rugby union footballer, he played as a flanker.

Career
His first international match for Fiji was against Tonga, at Apia, on 31 May 1988. Olsson was also called up in the 1991 Rugby World Cup Fijian squad, where he played only the match against Romania, which was his last international cap. He played for Suva and then, in 1994, for Suntory.
After retirement he works in the Fiji Rugby Union Development Unit's Leading Rugby and Development workshop and he is also National Operations manager for Fiji Gas. Max Olsson at 20 years played his first senior grade season in 1987 with St.Josephs Rugby Club in Whakatane. Max and the iconic Vesi Rauluni were recruited and coached by Vivian Hahipene of Te Teko.Max and Vesi were the first Fijian rugby import players into the Bay of Plenty and possibly into NZ. Max represented the BOP Colts and Vesi represented the BOP Seniors. In that same year they were selected into the Fiji National XV to tour South Africa. However, due to the political unrest they remained home.

Notes

External links

Fiji international rugby union players
Fijian rugby union players
Tokyo Sungoliath players
Rugby union flankers
1967 births
Living people